Eliza Gordon (29 January 1877 – 15 June 1938) was a New Zealand nurse, midwife and welfare worker. She was born in Glasgow, Lanarkshire, Scotland on 29 January 1877. Her second daughter, Esther, was adopted by Truby King and his wife, and became known as Mary King.

References

1877 births
1938 deaths
New Zealand nurses
New Zealand social workers
New Zealand midwives
Scottish emigrants to New Zealand
New Zealand women nurses
Adoption in New Zealand